This article shows the records by the Gold Coast Titans, since their inception in First Grade Competition in 2007.

Individual Records
 Current player

Most Games (100+)

Most Points (200+)

Most Points in a Match

Most Points in a Season (100+)

Most Tries (30+)

Most Tries in a Match

Most Tries in a Season

Youngest Players on Debut Game

Oldest players on final game

Coaching Records

Most Games

Most Wins

Highest Winning Percentage

Club Records

Highest home game attendance

Biggest wins

Biggest losses (30+)

Kept opposition to nil

Kept to nil

Longest winning streak

Longest winning home streak

Longest winning away streak

Longest losing streak

Longest losing home streak

Longest losing away streak

Biggest comeback
Recovered from an 18-point deficit.
 Trailed the Canterbury Bulldogs 18-0 after 51 minutes to win 19-18 at Cbus Super Stadium in Round 26, 2014.
Recovered from a 14-point deficit.
 Trailed the Newcastle Knights 14-0 after 31 minutes to win 34-20 at Skilled Park in Round 1, 2009.
 Trailed the Wests Tigers 14-0 after 24 minutes to win 20-14 at Skilled Park in Round 6, 2011.
 Trailed the Parramatta Eels 22-8 after 53 minutes to win 28-22 at Skilled Park in Round 6, 2013.
 Trailed the Canberra Raiders 20-6 after 64 minutes to win 24-20 at GIO Stadium in Round 4, 2016.

Worst collapse
Surrendered a 22-point lead.
 Led the Brisbane Broncos 22-0 after 14 minutes to lose 36-28 at Lang Park on 30 April 2021.

Surrendered a 14-point lead.
 Led the Wests Tigers 14-0 after 35 minutes to lose 14-15 at Robina Stadium on 5 May 2012.
 Led the Cronulla Sharks 14-0 after 37 minutes to lose 22-23 at Robina Stadium on 16 May 2015.
 Led the South Sydney Rabbitohs 14-0 after 28 minutes to lose 20-36 at ANZ Stadium on 16 June 2017.

Golden point record

Win–loss record

Biggest wins and losses (by opponent)

See also

List of NRL records

References

External links

Records
National Rugby League lists
Gold Coast, Queensland-related lists
Australian records
Rugby league records and statistics